The Arizona myotis (Myotis occultus) is a vesper bat species inhabiting much of the southwestern United States and central Mexico as far south as the Distrito Federal.

Taxonomy and etymology
It was described as a new species in 1909 by American zoologist Ned Hollister.
The holotype was collected near Needles, California, in 1905.
Its specific name "occultus" is Latin for "hidden or concealed".

Description
It is a small species with a total length of — of the total length,  consists of its tail. Its fur is glossy brown with a cinnamon tint. The ventral fur and its face are paler brown.

Range and habitat
Its range includes parts of the Southwestern United States and the Mexican state of Chihuahua.

Conservation
As of 2018, it is evaluated as a least-concern species by the IUCN. It meets the criteria for this classification because it has a wide geographic range, its range includes protected areas, and it is not likely experiencing rapid population decline.

References

Mouse-eared bats
Bats of the United States
Bats of Mexico
Mammals described in 1909
Taxa named by Ned Hollister